Charles John Thorn (14 July 1847 – 10 March 1935) was a notable New Zealand carpenter, undertaker and trade unionist. He was born in Leigh, Essex, England, in 1847.

References

1847 births
People from Leigh-on-Sea
1935 deaths
New Zealand trade unionists
English emigrants to New Zealand
New Zealand Liberal Party politicians
Dunedin City Councillors